The 2012 Heineken Cup Final was the final match of the 2011–12 Heineken Cup, the 17th season of Europe's top club rugby union competition. The match was played on 19 May 2012 at Twickenham Stadium in London, England. The final was between Ulster and defending champions Leinster. Leinster triumphed, with captain Leo Cullen becoming the first person to raise the trophy three times. The match broke many records, including the largest winning margin in a Heineken Cup final and the most points scored. It led to media reports suggesting Leinster were the greatest European club team of all time.

Background
It was confirmed on 1 May that the match was an 82,000 sell-out. 7,500 tickets were assigned to each province for the final with a Leinster spokesman saying that demand for tickets had outstripped supply with Ulster selling their remaining tickets to new 2012-13 season ticket holders.

Under rules of the competition organiser, European Rugby Cup (ERC), the winner of the Heineken Cup Final receives an automatic place in the following year's competition, apart from the normal allocation for the winning team's country. If the champion is already qualified through performance in its domestic or regional league, the cup holder's place (normally) passes to another team from its country.
Because Leinster and Ulster had already qualified for the 2012–13 Heineken Cup by their performance in Pro12, the fourth Irish place passed to Connacht.
Leinster, the first team since Toulouse (in 2005) to make back-to-back finals, stood to become the second team, and first since Leicester in 2002, to win back-to-back titles.

Match

Summary
Leinster beat Ulster by five tries to one. Leinster flanker Seán O'Brien and prop Cian Healy scored first half tries and the team scored a penalty try early in the second half. Leinster's replacement prop Heinke van der Merwe and Seán Cronin both scored tries late on and Fergus McFadden converted Cronin's try, completing the largest winning margin in a Heineken Cup final. Leinster fly-half Johnny Sexton scored 15 points in total (from three conversions and three penalties).

The result represented both a record winning points total and a record winning margin for a Heineken Cup Final. Leinster become only the second team to defend the title successfully and the first to win it three times in four years.
Leo Cullen became the first captain to raise the trophy three times.

Details

See also
2011–12 Heineken Cup

References

External links
 RTÉ In Pictures: Leinster versus Ulster

Final
2012
Rugby union in London
2011–12 in Irish rugby union
2012 in Northern Ireland sport
2012 sports events in London
May 2012 sports events in the United Kingdom
Leinster Rugby matches
Ulster Rugby matches